The Keweenaw Fault is a reverse fault that bisects the Keweenaw Peninsula of the Upper Peninsula of Michigan. The fault thrusts lava flows of the Midcontinent Rift System onto sedimentary rocks of the Jacobsville Sandstone. The fault is part of the inversion of the Midcontinent Rift where a region that had previously undergone extension experienced significant contraction. This contraction occurred during the final stages of the Grenvillian orogeny. The Keweenaw Peninsula, itself, is the southeastern side of a large syncline beneath Lake Superior. The northwestern side forms Isle Royale.

The fault is most likely younger than the Jacobsville Formation and the Devonian Period.

A seismic event in 1906 claimed to be an earthquake has been attributed to a rock burst, as the area has been significantly mined.

The Natural Wall
One significant feature along the Keweenaw Fault is known as the Natural Wall. The Wall is a near-vertical slope of the Jacobsville Sandstone which dips as steeply 85°. The steep dip of the Jacobsville Sandstone is the result of it being folded due to motion on the fault.

References

Geology of Michigan